The Dancer and the Thief is a 2009 film directed by Fernando Trueba. It is an adaptation of the novel of the same name by author Antonio Skármeta.

Plot 
Following the 1988 national plebiscite and the arrival of democracy in Chile, the president declares a general amnesty for all prisoners who were convicted of non-violent crimes.

Among these released prisoners are the young Ángel Santiago and the veteran Vergara Grey, a notorious thief. The two have different aspirations: while Vergara Grey only wishes to reunite with his family and start anew, Ángel dreams of seeking revenge against the prison warden and carrying out a major heist with Grey. However, Ángel's plans change when he meets the young Victoria, a ballet dancer who hasn't spoken since losing her parents as a child during the Chilean dictatorship.

The lives of all three characters are irreversibly transformed as they face a new future.

Cast 
 Ricardo Darín as Vergara Grey
 Abel Ayala as Ángel Santiago
 Miranda Bodenhöfer as Victoria Ponce
 Ariadna Gil as Teresa Capriatti
 Julio Jung as warden Santoro

Production 
Adapting the Antonio Skármeta's novel El baile de la Victoria, Fernando Trueba, Jonás Trueba and Skármeta himself collaborated in the writing of the screenplay. The film was produced by Fernando Trueba P.C. Shooting started in Chile in July 2008.

Trueba said of the film:
“I am proud of how I have portrayed [Santiago], I believe it is very interesting visually. This is above all a romantic film, but with elements of comedy and film noir. It’s film-noir and it is western, it’s realist and very romantic. Definitively Latin American.”

Release 
Distributed by Notro Films, the film was theatrically released in Spain on 27 November 2009.
The film was selected as the Spanish entry for the Best Foreign Language Film at the 82nd Academy Awards.

Accolades 

|-
| align = "center" rowspan = "9" | 2010 || rowspan = "9" | 24th Goya Awards || colspan = "2" | Best Film ||  || rowspan = "9" | 
|-
| Best Director || Fernando Trueba || 
|-
| Best Adapted Screenplay || Antonio Skármeta, Fernando Trueba, Jonás Trueba || 
|-
| Best Supporting Actor || Ricardo Darín || 
|-
| Best Production Supervision || Eduardo Castro || 
|-
| Best Editing || Carmen Frías || 
|-
| Best Art Direction || Carmen Frías || 
|-
| Best Costume Design || Lala Huete || 
|-
| Best Sound || Pierre Gamet, Nacho Royo-Villanova, Pelayo Gutiérrez || 
|}

Reviews 
The film had mixed reviews:
Hollywood Reporter review
EMOL review (es)
Screendaily review

See also 
 List of Spanish films of 2009
 Cinema of Chile

References

External links
 

Chilean drama films
2000s Spanish-language films
2009 films
Films shot in Chile
Films directed by Fernando Trueba
Spanish drama films
2000s dance films
Films set in Chile
2000s Spanish films